Laguncularia is a genus of plants in the family Combretaceae. The only species in the genus is Laguncularia racemosa, the white mangrove.

It is native to the coasts of western Africa from Senegal to Cameroon, the Atlantic Coast of the Americas from Bermuda and Florida to the Bahamas, Mexico, the Caribbean, and south to Brazil; and on the Pacific Coast of the Americas from Mexico to northwestern Peru, including the Galápagos Islands.

The bark is gray-brown or reddish, and rough and fissured. Pneumatophores and/or prop roots may be present, depending on environmental conditions. The single seed is sometimes viviparous.

It grows in coastal areas of bays, lagoons, and tidal creeks, typically growing inland of other mangroves, well above the high tide line.

References

External links

Smithsonian Marine Station: Laguncularia recemosa
Purdue University: Laguncularia recemosa

Combretaceae
Monotypic Myrtales genera
Tropical Atlantic flora
Tropical Eastern Pacific flora